The Siberian Traps is a large region of volcanic rock, known as a large igneous province, in Siberia, Russia. The massive eruptive event that formed the traps is one of the largest known volcanic events in the last  years.

The eruptions continued for roughly two million years and spanned the Permian–Triassic boundary, or P–T boundary, which occurred around 251.9 million years ago. The Siberian Traps are believed to be the primary cause of the Permian–Triassic extinction event, the most severe extinction event in the geologic record. Subsequent periods of Siberian Traps activity have been linked to a number of smaller biotic crises, including the Smithian-Spathian, Olenekian-Anisian, Middle-Late Anisian, and Anisian-Ladinian extinction events.

Large volumes of basaltic lava covered a large expanse of Siberia in a flood basalt event.

Etymology

The term "trap" has been used in geology since 1785–1795 for such rock formations. It is derived from the Swedish word for stairs ("trappa") and refers to the step-like hills forming the landscape of the region.

Formation
The source of the Siberian Traps basaltic rock has been attributed to a mantle plume, which rose until it reached the bottom of the Earth's crust, producing volcanic eruptions through the Siberian Craton. It has been suggested that, as the Earth's lithospheric plates moved over the mantle plume (the Iceland plume), the plume produced the Siberian Traps in the Permian and Triassic periods, after earlier producing the Viluy Traps to the east, and later going on to produce volcanic activity on the floor of the Arctic Ocean in the Jurassic and Cretaceous, and then generating volcanic activity in Iceland. Other plate tectonic causes have also been suggested. Another possible cause may be the impact that formed the Wilkes Land crater in Antarctica, which is estimated to have occurred around the same time and been nearly antipodal to the traps.

The main source of rock in this formation is basalt, but both mafic and felsic rocks are present, so this formation is officially called a Flood Basalt Province. The inclusion of mafic and felsic rock indicates multiple other eruptions that occurred and coincided with the one-million-year-long set of eruptions that created the majority of the basaltic layers. The traps are divided into sections based on their chemical, stratigraphical, and petrographical composition.

The Siberian traps are underlain by the Tungus Syneclise, a large sedimentary basin containing thick sequences of Early-Mid Paleozoic aged carbonate and evaporite deposits, as well as Carboniferous-Permian aged coal bearing clastic rocks. When heated, such as by igneous intrusions, these rocks are capable of emitting large amounts of toxic and greenhouse gases.

Effects on prehistoric life

One of the major questions is whether the Siberian Traps were directly responsible for the Permian–Triassic mass extinction event that occurred 250 million years ago, or if they were themselves caused by some other, larger event, such as an asteroid impact. A recent hypothesis put forward is that the volcanism triggered the growth of Methanosarcina, a microbe that then emitted large amounts of methane into Earth's atmosphere, ultimately altering the Earth's carbon cycle based on observations such as a significant increase of inorganic carbon reservoirs in marine environments.

This extinction event, also colloquially called the Great Dying, affected all life on Earth, and is estimated to have led to the extinction of about 81% of all marine species and 70% of terrestrial vertebrate species living at the time. Some of the disastrous events that affected the Earth continued to repeat themselves five to six million years after the initial extinction occurred. Over time a small portion of the life that survived the extinction was able to repopulate and expand starting with low trophic levels (local communities) until the higher trophic levels (large habitats) were able to be re-established. Calculations of sea water temperature from δ18O measurements indicate that at the peak of the extinction, the Earth underwent lethally hot global warming, in which equatorial ocean temperatures exceeded . It took roughly eight to nine million years for any diverse ecosystem to be re-established; however, new classes of animals were established after the extinction that did not exist beforehand.

Palaeontological evidence further indicates that the global distribution of tetrapods vanished, with very rare exceptions in the region of Pangaea that is today Utah, between latitudes bounded by approximately 40°S to 30°N. The tetrapod gap of equatorial Pangaea coincides with an end-Permian to Middle Triassic global "coal gap" that indicates the loss of peat swamps. Peat formation, a product of high plant productivity, was reestablished only in the Anisian stage of the Triassic, and even then only in high southern latitudes, although gymnosperm forests appeared earlier (in the Early Spathian), but again only in northern and southern higher latitudes. In equatorial Pangaea, the establishment of conifer-dominated forests was not until the end of the Spathian, and the first coals at these latitudes did not appear until the Carnian, around 15 million years after their end-Permian disappearance. These signals suggest equatorial temperatures exceeded their thermal tolerance for many marine vertebrates at least during two thermal maxima, whereas terrestrial equatorial temperatures were sufficiently severe to suppress plant and animal abundance during most of the Early Triassic.

Dating
The volcanism that occurred in the Siberian Traps resulted in copious amounts of magma being ejected from the Earth's crust—leaving permanent traces of rock from the same time period of the mass extinction that can be examined today. More specifically, zircon is found in some of the volcanic rocks. To further the accuracy of the age of the zircon, several varying aged pieces of zircon were organized into a timeline based on when they crystallized. The CA-TIMS technique, a chemical abrasion age-dating technique that eliminates variability in accuracy due to lead depletion in zircon over time, was then used to accurately determine the age of the zircons found in the Siberian Traps. Eliminating the variability due to lead, the CA-TIMS age-dating technique allowed uranium within the zircon to be the centre focus in linking the volcanism in the Siberian Traps that resulted in high amounts of magmatic material with the Permian–Triassic mass extinction.

To further the connection with the Permian–Triassic extinction event, other disastrous events occurred around the same time period, such as sea level changes, meteor impacts and volcanism. Specifically focusing on volcanism, rock samples from the Siberian Traps and other southern regions were obtained and compared. Basalts and gabbro samples from several southern regions close to and from the Siberian Traps were dated based on argon isotope 40 and argon isotope 39 age-dating methods. Feldspar and biotite was specifically used to focus on the samples' age and duration of the presence of magma from the volcanic event in the Siberian Traps. The majority of the basalt and gabbro samples dated to 250 million years ago, covered a surface area of five million square kilometres on the Siberian Traps and occurred within a short period of time with rapid rock solidification/cooling. Studies confirmed that samples of gabbro and basalt from the same time period of the Permian–Triassic event from the other southern regions also matched the age of samples within the Siberian Traps. This confirms the assumption of the linkage between the age of volcanic rocks within the Siberian Traps, along with rock samples from other southern regions to the Permian–Triassic mass extinction event.

Mineral deposits

The giant Norilsk-Talnakh nickel–copper–palladium deposit formed within the magma conduits in the most complete part of the Siberian Traps. It has been linked to the Permian–Triassic extinction event, which occurred approximately 251.4 million years ago, based on large amounts of nickel and other elements found in rock beds that were laid down after the extinction occurred. The method used to correlate the extinction event with the surplus amount of nickel located in the Siberian Traps compares the timeline of the magmatism within the traps and the timeline of the extinction itself. Before the linkage between magmatism and the extinction event was discovered, it was hypothesized that the mass extinction and volcanism occurred at the same time due to the linkages in rock composition.

See also

List of flood basalt provinces
Deccan Traps
Emeishan Traps
Viluy Traps
Trap rock

References

External links
"The Siberian Traps" by Richard Cowen
"The Siberian Traps Large Igneous Province"

Large igneous provinces
Volcanism of Russia
Permian–Triassic extinction event
Geography of Siberia
Permian volcanism
Triassic volcanism
Permian paleontological sites
Events that forced the climate